Cordero Bonamy (born 13 September 1988) is a Bahamian sprinter from Nassau, Bahamas who competed in the 100m and 200. He attended St. Johns College High School in Nassau, before going on to compete for Dickinson State University. He then went on to The University of the West Indies Mona in Jamaica to study Physical Therapy.

Bonamy competed at the 2010 NACAC Under-23 Championships in Athletics in Miramar, Florida.

Personal bests

References

External links
 World Athletics Bio

1988 births
Living people
Bahamian male sprinters
Sportspeople from Nassau, Bahamas
People from Nassau, Bahamas
Dickinson State University alumni
University of the West Indies alumni
Physiotherapists